József Mácsár (born 13 September 1938) is a Hungarian middle-distance runner. He competed in the men's 3000 metres steeplechase at the 1964 Summer Olympics.

References

1938 births
Living people
Athletes (track and field) at the 1964 Summer Olympics
Hungarian male middle-distance runners
Hungarian male steeplechase runners
Olympic athletes of Hungary
Place of birth missing (living people)
20th-century Hungarian people